Lasioglossum michiganense is a species of sweat bee in the family Halictidae.

References

Further reading

 

michiganense
Articles created by Qbugbot